Parkend is a hamlet in the Sandwick region of the Isle of Lewis, although like Melbost, it is not a part of the Eye Peninsula. Many people erroneously believe it to be a suburb of Stornoway, on the island of Lewis and Harris in the Outer Hebrides of Scotland. Parkend is within the parish of Stornoway. Parkend is situated on the A866, and the adjoining Holm Road allows access to the nearby Holm Village. The Parkend Industrial Estate is adjacent to the small housing estate.

See also 
 History of the Outer Hebrides

References

External links 

 Visitor's guide for the Island of Lewis
 Website of the Western Isles Council with links to other resources
 Disabled access to Lewis for residents and visitors
 
 A Guide to living in the Outer Hebrides, with most information pertaining to Lewis

Villages in the Isle of Lewis